The Vietnam national under-17 football team, officially known as the National U-16–U-17 Selection Teams, represents Vietnam in international association football competitions at under-16 and under-17 age levels. It is controlled by the Vietnam Football Federation.

Honours

Continental
 AFC U-17 Asian Cup
 Fourth place (1): 2000

Regional
 AFF U-16 Youth Championship
 Champion (3): 2006, 2010, 2017
 Runner-up (2): 2016 , 2022

Competitive records

FIFA U-17 World Cup

AFC U-16 Championship

AFF U-16 Youth Championship

Results and fixtures

2022

2022 AFF U-16 Youth Championship (6–18 August) 

2023 AFC U-17 Asian Cup qualification

Players

Current squad 
The following 23 players were called up for the 2023 AFC U-17 Asian Cup qualification

Coaching staff

References

External links
 U-16, U-17 Vietnam
 
 

U-17
Asian national under-17 association football teams